Holly Elissa (born 1 October 1979, as Holly Elissa Dignard), is a Canadian artist, actress, filmmaker and activist. She is an advocate for women's rights, child welfare, social injustice and discrimination as well as a supporter of animal and environmental welfare.

Career 
She made her TV debut on Syfy's hit series Outer Limits in 2000. Her other credits include The Chris Isaak Show, Stargate SG-1, Voyage of the Unicorn, Stargate Atlantis, The L Word, Battlestar Galactica, Kyle X/Y, Eureka, Supernatural, Kill Switch, Ice Quake, Polar Storm, and Arrow. She was one of the stars of the Canadian series Whistler.

Filmography

Film

Television

References

External links
 
 Official site www.calebshope.org

1981 births
Living people
Actresses from New Brunswick
Canadian film actresses
Canadian television actresses
People from Moncton
21st-century Canadian actresses